Nicolás Almagro defended his title by defeating Filippo Volandri 6–3, 4–6, 6–4 in the final.

Seeds

Draw

Finals

Top half

Bottom half

Qualifying

Seeds

Qualifiers

Draw

First qualifier

Second qualifier

Third qualifier

Fourth qualifier

References
Main Draw
Qualifying Draw

Brasil Open - Singles
2012 Brasil Open